Rác, Racz, Rátz, Morác, Moracz or Morasch is a Hungarian language surname derived from "Rascians", an early term for Serbs but to some extent also for  Bunjevci and Šokci who where sometimes referred as Catholic Rascians. It may refer to:

Aladár Rácz (1886–1958), Hungarian cimbalom player
Andy Racz (born 1930), American soccer player
Felix Rácz (born 1973), Hungarian businessman
Ferenc Rácz (born 1991), Hungarian football player
Gabor B. Racz (born 1937), American physician
István Rácz (botanist) (born 1952), Hungarian botanist
János Rácz (1941–2023), Hungarian basketball player
Jenő Rácz (Minister of Finance) (1907–1981), Hungarian politician
József Rácz (born 1957), Hungarian physician, psychiatrist
Lajos Rácz (born 1952), Hungarian wrestler
László Rác Szabó (born 1957), Serbian politician
Mihaly Racz Rajna (born 1934), Hungarian actor
Róbert Rácz (born 1967), Hungarian politician
Sándor Rácz (1933–2013), Hungarian politician
Vali Racz (1911–1997), Hungarian singer and actress
Vilmos Rácz (1889–1976), Hungarian athlete
Vasyl Rats (born in 1961, in Hungarian Rácz László) Soviet footballer
Zsófia Rácz (born 1988), Hungarian football player
Felix Rácz (born 1973), Hungarian businessman

See also
RAC (disambiguation)
Raška (region)
Rascians
Bunjevci
Šokci
RATS (disambiguation)
Ratz (disambiguation)
Serbs in Hungary
Hungarians in Serbia
South Slavs

References 

Hungarian words and phrases
Hungarian-language surnames